Historisk Tidsskrift is a Norwegian history journal. It was established in 1870 by Ludvig Ludvigsen Daae and Michael Birkeland. It is published quarterly by the Norwegian Historical Association, and until 1955 the editor-in-chief was identical with the chairman of that organization.

References

History journals
Norwegian-language journals
Publications established in 1871
1871 establishments in Norway
Quarterly journals
Universitetsforlaget academic journals